The Food Technology Industrial Achievement Award has been awarded by the Institute of Food Technologists since 1959. It is awarded for the development of an outstanding food process or product that represents a significant advance in the application of food technology to food production. The process or product must have been successfully applied in actual commercial operations between six months and seven years before December 1 in the year of the nomination.

Sponsored by Food Technology magazine, award winners receive a plaque from IFT.

Winners

References

List of past winners - Official site
Food technology awards
Awards established in 1959